Lynn Joseph Frazier (December 21, 1874January 11, 1947) was an American educator and politician who served as the 12th Governor of North Dakota from 1917 until being recalled in 1921 and later served as a U.S. Senator from North Dakota from 1923 to 1941. He was the first American governor ever successfully recalled from office. The only other American governor to ever be recalled is Gray Davis, who was recalled in 2003.

Early life 
Frazier was born in Medford, Minnesota. His family moved to North Dakota when he was six years old. Prior to his career in state and national politics, Frazier was a farmer and school teacher. He graduated from Grafton High School in 1892, and Mayville Normal School in 1895. He completed his bachelor's degree at the University of North Dakota and graduated with honors in 1902.

Career
After winning the Republican primary as the Nonpartisan League candidate, Frazier was elected Governor in 1916 with 79% of the vote. Frazier was extremely popular and implemented several reforms such as the establishment of the Bank of North Dakota and the North Dakota Mill and Elevator, which have been a lasting legacy of the Nonpartisan League election success until today.

During the 1919 national coal strike, Governor Frazier took a unique approach to the strike. He declared martial law, took over the mines with United Mine Workers of America contracts and ran them in cooperation with the union.

He was re-elected twice, in 1918 and 1920, but an economic depression hit the agricultural sector during his third term and resulted in a successful private-business-led grassroots movement to press for his recall. In 1921, Frazier was the first governor to be successfully removed from office. Independent Voters Association member Ragnvald Nestos was elected to his place.

After the recall, Frazier was elected in 1922 to the U.S. Senate, again as the NPL candidate on the Republican ticket. He served until losing a bid for re-election in 1940, when he was unseated in the Republican primary by William Langer.

Personal life
Frazier was twice married, to Lottie J. Stafford, with whom he had five children, from November 26, 1903 until her death on January 14, 1935, and to  Catherine Paulson, whom he married in 1937.

Death and legacy
Frazier died in Riverdale, Maryland, on January 11, 1947, at the age of 72.  He is buried in Hoople Cemetery, Hoople, North Dakota.

Governor Frazier is portrayed in the 1984 Nebraska Public TV documentary Plowing up a Storm.

References

Further reading

External links 

 

National Governors Association

|-

|-

|-

|-

|-

1874 births
1947 deaths
20th-century American politicians
Methodists from North Dakota
Republican Party governors of North Dakota
Nonpartisan League state governors of the United States
Nonpartisan League United States senators
People from Steele County, Minnesota
People from Walsh County, North Dakota
Recalled American politicians
Republican Party United States senators from North Dakota
University of North Dakota alumni